Botovro (Mpotovoro) is an Oceanic language, which is primarily spoken at the north tip of Malekula, Vanuatu.

References

Malekula languages
Languages of Vanuatu